The Independent Media Council (IMC) in Ukraine is an impartial and professional self-regulation body in the media field. It was established in 2016 by the Centre for Democracy and the Rule of Law (CEDEM, which acts as its secretariat), the Institute of Mass Media, Internews-Ukraine, Detector Media and Souspilnist Foundation. It consists of representatives of the fifteen leading media organizations in the country and carries out independent assessment of the controversial cases in the Ukrainian media sector. Each of the founding organizations delegates to the IMC three representatives, at least one of whom must not be a member of the delegating organization. Its chair is human rights lawyer and international development expert Antonina Cherevko. Its board members include Nataliya Gumenyuk.

Notes

See also
 National Television and Radio Broadcasting Council of Ukraine

External links
 IMC website

Censorship in Ukraine
Mass media complaints authorities
Self-regulatory organizations
2014 establishments in Ukraine
Organizations established in 2014
Mass media in Ukraine